Factory Floor are a London-based band formed in 2005. They have been described as 'post-industrial', using live drums, synthesizers and noise.

History
The band formed in 2005, originally comprising Gabriel Gurnsey and Mark Harris, who were then joined by Dominic Butler. Harris later left, going on to form Shift Work.  Gurnsey and Butler were then joined by Nik Colk (aka Nik Colk Void), formerly of KaitO, in 2010. Gurnsey played drums and drum machines, Butler played modular synths and electronics, and Colk added manipulated vocals, guitar and samples.

After two singles in 2008, and a mini-album, Talking On Cliffs in 2009, the band signed to Blast First's 'Blast First Petite' label, releasing several twelve-inch singles, including "Wooden Box" (featuring a Stephen Morris remix) and an untitled ten-inch mini-LP in 2010. The latter was described by the NME as "a terrifying racket that simultaneously frazzles the nerves and slackens the bowels" and "an incessant drone of keyboards wired through twisted-metal synthesizers and thundering drums summoned from the heavens"; writer Ben Hewitt giving it a 9/10 rating. The singles "Real Love" and "Two Different Ways" followed in 2011.

The band approached Morris by sending him a CD and asking if he would do a remix. After remixing "Wooden Box", Morris continued to work with the band as producer.

Two twelve-inch releases followed featuring remixes by Stephen Morris and Chris Carter. Since then, Factory Floor released "(R E A L L O V E)" (Optimo) and "Two Different Ways" on DFA Records.

In 2011 the band played a support slot for Chris & Cosey at the ICA, and Chris Carter joined the band later that year for two performances at Primavera Sound and the Roundhouse.

Colk Void released a single, "Gold E", under the name Nik Colk Void in February 2012.

"Fall Back", the first single off their debut album, was released on 14 January 2013.

Factory Floor's debut self-titled album was released on 9 September 2013 featuring new versions of their previous singles "Two Different Ways" and "Fall Back", after which Dominic Butler departed the group. Their second album 25 25 was released on 19 August 2016, to positive reviews.

Musical style
Early single "Bipolar" drew comparisons with Joy Division and The Fall. Paul Lester of The Guardian described the band in 2009 as "metronomic synth-noir over which a woman – who vaguely resembles, vocally, Nico in a particularly dark mood – intones mournfully". Collaborator Stephen Morris described the band's sound as "unsettling disco". The NME described the band as "post industrial, but it moves beyond that; this is post-apocalyptic, the soundtrack of an underworld disco." FACT magazine described them as "tech-savvy but pared-down no wave electronic rock".

Discography

Studio albums
 Factory Floor (2013), DFA Records/Rough Trade
 25 25 (2016), DFA Records
 A Soundtrack For A Film (2018), Heart Of Data Records

EPs
Talking On Cliffs (2009), mini-album
Untitled (2010), Blast First Petite

Singles
"Bipolar" (2008), Outside Sound
Planning Application EP (2008), One of One
"A Wooden Box" (2010), Blast First Petite
Remix Series 1 12" (2010), Blast First Petite
Remix Series 2 12" (2010), Blast First Petite
"(R E A L L O V E)" 12" (2011), Optimo
"Two Different Ways" 12" (2011), DFA Records

References

English electronic rock musical groups
British industrial music groups
English experimental musical groups
British musical trios
Musical groups established in 2005
Musical groups from London